Leonard H. Russon is a former justice of the Utah Supreme Court.

Russon is a Latter-day Saint.  He served in the United States Navy during the Korean War.  He received both his bachelors and law degrees from the University of Utah.  He then practiced law in both California and Utah for over 20 years.

In 1984 Russon was appointed to the third judicial circuit by Governor Scott M. Matheson.  He was appointed to the Utah Court of Appeals in 1991 and to the Utah Supreme Court in 1994. He retired in 2003.

Sources
Deseret News, May 10, 2000
Utah bar bio of Russon
Retirement of Justice Russon

American Latter Day Saints
University of Utah alumni
Justices of the Utah Supreme Court
Living people
Year of birth missing (living people)